Robert M. Berne (April 22, 1918 – October 4, 2001) was a heart specialist and a medical educator whose textbooks were used by generations of physicians
Berne was recognized widely  for his seminal research contributions on the role of adenosine in the blood flow to the heart. He served as the editor of the peer-reviewed journal the Annual Review of Physiology from 1983–1988.

Awards and Distinctions 
Berne was the Chair and the Founder of cardiovascular research at the University of Virginia as well as the Chair of Department of Physiology there,

He was also President of the American Physiological Society.
Berne was a member of the National Academy of Sciences, the American Association for the Advancement of Science and the American Academy of Arts and Sciences.
Berne was the Editor in Chief of Circulation Research, a publication of the American Heart Association from 1970 to 1975.
He received the Gold Heart Award of the American Heart Association in 1985.
He also received a special citation from the American Heart Association in 1979.
The National Academies Press called Berne "an acclaimed authority in the field of cardiovascular physiology".

Career and life 
Berne was born in Yonkers, New York.
He graduated from the University of North Carolina at Chapel Hill in 1939, and from Harvard Medical School in 1943.
In late 1944 he served in the US Army as a medical officer. At the end of the war he took up a residency in Internal Medicine at Mount Sinai with the focus on cardiology.
Berne joined the physiology faculty of Western Reserve University in Cleveland in 1949, and remained in that position for 17 years.
In 1966 he was appointed Chair of the Physiology Department at the University of Virginia and served in that capacity until 1988.
He published more than 200 scientific articles and three textbooks authored with Matthew N. Levy.

Notable textbooks 
 Principles of Physiology
 Cardiovascular Physiology
 Case Studies in Physiology.

References

External links
Matthew N. Levy, "Robert M. Berne", Biographical Memoirs of the National Academy of Sciences (2004)

1918 births
2001 deaths
American cardiologists
Members of the United States National Academy of Sciences
Harvard Medical School alumni
People from Yonkers, New York
Medical school textbook writers
American textbook writers
University of Virginia School of Medicine faculty
University of North Carolina at Chapel Hill alumni
Annual Reviews (publisher) editors
United States Army personnel of World War II
Members of the National Academy of Medicine
Circulation Research editors